The 1940 Iowa State Teachers Panthers football team represented Iowa State Teachers College in the North Central Conference during the 1940 college football season. In its fifth season under head coach Clyde Starbeck, the team compiled an 8–1 record (5–0 against NCC opponents) and won the conference championship. After losing its season opener against Creighton, the team won its final eight games.

Schedule

References

Iowa State Teachers
Northern Iowa Panthers football seasons
North Central Conference football champion seasons
Iowa State Teachers Panthers football